Christopher Janik (born 27 March 1986) is a Singaporean cricketer. He played in the 2014 ICC World Cricket League Division Three tournament.

References

External links
 

1986 births
Living people
Singaporean cricketers
Place of birth missing (living people)